Jin Sun-ryeong (born 20 June 1971) is a South Korean sports shooter. She competed in the women's 10 metre air rifle event at the 1996 Summer Olympics.

References

External links
 

1971 births
Living people
South Korean female sport shooters
Olympic shooters of South Korea
Shooters at the 1996 Summer Olympics
Place of birth missing (living people)
Asian Games silver medalists for South Korea
Asian Games medalists in shooting
Shooters at the 1990 Asian Games
Medalists at the 1990 Asian Games
20th-century South Korean women
21st-century South Korean women